General Georg Meiring  (born 18 October 1939) is a South African military commander. He served as Chief of the Army (1990–93) and Chief of the South African National Defence Force (1993–98).

Military career
After obtaining a Master of Science in Physics from the University of the Orange Free State, Meiring joined the South African Army as a signals officer in 1962 and, in 1980, became Director of Signals of the South African Army.

Meiring served as Deputy Chief of the Army from 1982 to 1983 and as General Officer Commanding (GOC) South West Africa Territorial Force from 1983 to 1987. He was later GOC Far North Command, Deputy Chief of the Army again, Chief of the Army from 1990 to 1993, the last Chief of the South African Defence Force from 1993 to 1994, and the first Chief of the South African National Defence Force from 1994 to 1998.

Controversy
In February 1998, Meiring, in his capacity as the head of defence of South Africa had provided an intelligence report to President Nelson Mandela on an organisation by the name of "Front African People's Liberation Army". This report implicated many important government dignitaries on conspiracy to assassinate the president, murder judges, occupy parliament and broadcasting stations and cause mayhem in general. Later, after it was investigated by a judge, the report was claimed to be fabricated.

Awards and decorations
In 1998, Meiring was awarded the Star of South Africa, Gold. He also received the Order of the Cloud and Banner 4th class from Taiwan.

References

|-

|-

|-

|-

|-

1939 births
Living people
Afrikaner people
South African people of German descent
University of the Free State alumni
People from Ladybrand
South African military personnel of the Border War
Chiefs of the South African Army